Ebnat-Kappel is a municipality in the Wahlkreis (constituency) of Toggenburg in the canton of St. Gallen in Switzerland.

History
Kappel is first mentioned in 1218 as Capelle.  Until 1762 Ebnat was known as Ober-Wattwil.

Geography

Of this area, 49% is used for agricultural purposes, while 42.9% is forested. Of the rest of the land, 5.2% is settled (buildings or roads) and the remainder (2.9%) is non-productive (rivers or lakes).

The municipality is located in the Toggenburg Wahlkreis in the Thur river valley.  It was formed in 1965 through the merger of Ebnat and Kappel.  It consists of the linear villages of Ebnat and Kappel and scattered settlements.

Coat of arms
The blazon of the municipal coat of arms is Per bend sinister Or a Semi Unicorn couped rampant langued Gules and Azure a Chapel Argent roofed Gules.

Demographics
, about 14.8% of the population was made up of foreign nationals. Of the foreign population,, 59 are from Germany, 127 are from Italy, 322 are from ex-Yugoslavia, 16 are from Austria, 184 are from Turkey,  and 97 are from another country. Over the last 10 years the population has decreased at a rate of -1.6%. Most of the population speaks German (89.9%), with Turkish being second most common ( 2.5%) and Italian being third ( 1.8%). Of the Swiss national languages, 4,502 speak German, 12 people speak French, 92 people speak Italian, and 9 people speak Romansh.

The age distribution, in Ebnat-Kappel is; 584 children or 11.7% of the population are between 0 and 9 years old and 756 teenagers or 15.1% are between 10 and 19.  Of the adult population, 579 people or 11.6% of the population are between 20 and 29 years old.  637 people or 12.7% are between 30 and 39, 697 people or 13.9% are between 40 and 49, and 607 people or 12.1% are between 50 and 59.  The senior population distribution is 453 people or 9.0% of the population are between 60 and 69 years old, 413 people or 8.2% are between 70 and 79, there are 246 people or 4.9% who are between 80 and 89, and there are 35 people or 0.7% who are between 90 and 99.

 there were 609 persons (or 12.2% of the population) who were living alone in a private dwelling.  There were 1,139 (or 22.7%) persons who were part of a couple (married or otherwise committed) without children, and 2,718 (or 54.3%) who were part of a couple with children.  There were 238 (or 4.8%) people who lived in single parent home, while there are 26 persons who were adult children living with one or both parents, 20 persons who lived in a household made up of relatives, 20 who lived household made up of unrelated persons, and 237 who are either institutionalized or live in another type of collective housing.

In the 2007 federal election the most popular party was the SVP which received 40.9% of the vote.  The next three most popular parties were the FDP (14.8%), the SP (14.7%) and the CVP (12.6%).

The entire Swiss population is generally well educated.  In Ebnat-Kappel about 64.3% of the population (between age 25-64) have completed either non-mandatory upper secondary education or additional higher education (either university or a Fachhochschule).  Out of the total population in Ebnat-Kappel, the highest education level completed by 1,297 people (25.9% of the population) was Primary, while 1,729 (34.5%) have completed Secondary, 373 (7.4%) have attended a Tertiary school, and 227 (4.5%) are not in school.  The remainder did not answer this question.

The historical population is given in the following table:

Sights
The village of Ebnat-Kappel and the Trempel are designated as part of the Inventory of Swiss Heritage Sites.

Economy
, Ebnat-Kappel had an unemployment rate of 1.49%.  , there were 207 people employed in the primary economic sector and about 99 businesses involved in this sector.  822 people are employed in the secondary sector and there are 63 businesses in this sector.  772 people are employed in the tertiary sector, with 136 businesses in this sector.

 the average unemployment rate was 3.3%.  There were 290 businesses in the municipality of which 53 were involved in the secondary sector of the economy while 142 were involved in the third.

 there were 1,374 residents who worked in the municipality, while 1,081 residents worked outside Ebnat-Kappel and 672 people commuted into the municipality for work.

Religion
Of the rest of the population, there is 1 individual who belongs to the Christian Catholic faith, there are 45 individuals (or about 0.90% of the population) who belong to the Orthodox Church, and there are 209 individuals (or about 4.17% of the population) who belong to another Christian church. There are 452 (or about 9.03% of the population) who are Islamic. There are 23 individuals (or about 0.46% of the population) who belong to another church (not listed on the census), 253 (or about 5.05% of the population) belong to no church, are agnostic or atheist, and 160 individuals (or about 3.20% of the population) did not answer the question.

Weather
Ebnat-Kappel has an average of 151.1 days of rain or snow per year and on average receives  of precipitation. During this month there is precipitation for an average of 14.3 days.

See also 
 Ebnat-Kappel railway station

References

External links

 Official website 
 

Municipalities of the canton of St. Gallen
Toggenburg